Barya may refer to:

 Nara people, or Barya, an ethnic group inhabiting southwestern Eritrea
 Barya, India, a settlement in Dakshina Kannada district, India
 Barya (fungus), a genus of funguses in the family Clavicipitaceae
 Barya, a genus of plants in the family Begoniaceae, synonym of Begonia